A constitutional referendum was held in Syria on 10 July 1953. The changes to the constitution were approved by 99.7% of voters, with turnout reported to be 86.8%.

Results

References

1953 referendums
1953 in Syria
Referendums in Syria
Constitutional referendums in Syria